Father's Day is a 1996 German comedy film directed by Sherry Hormann.

Cast 
 Herbert Knaup - Thomas
 Corinna Harfouch - Bettina
 Richy Müller - Johannes
 Dominik Graf - Lorenz
 Axel Milberg - Philipp
 Natalia Wörner - Susanne
 Lena May Graf - Gina
 Robert Gwisdek - Leo
 Adele Neuhauser - Schlegel

External links 

1996 films
1996 comedy films
German comedy films
Films directed by Sherry Hormann
Father's Day
1990s German films
1990s German-language films